Anticharis is a genus of flowering plants belonging to the family Scrophulariaceae.

Its native range is Africa to India.

Species:

Anticharis angolensis 
Anticharis arabica 
Anticharis ebracteata 
Anticharis glandulosa 
Anticharis imbricata 
Anticharis inflata 
Anticharis juncea 
Anticharis kaokoensis 
Anticharis namibensis 
Anticharis scoparia 
Anticharis senegalensis

References

Scrophulariaceae
Scrophulariaceae genera